Gran Canaria is a Spanish Denominación de Origen Protegida (DOP) that covers the entire island of Gran Canaria (Canary Islands, Spain) comprising 21 municipalities. It obtained its official status in 2009.

The cultivation of the vine in Gran Canaria dates back to the end of the s. XV, when the first vines from Crete arrive. In the S. XVI, Canarian wines, due to their quality and prosperity, began to be exported to England, Flanders, Hamburg and the new world. Towards the middle of the century, wine in Gran Canaria played a fundamental role in the island's agricultural economy, becoming the main export product due to the decline in sugar cane cultivation. However, this privileged situation was soon damaged due to the international situation: that is, the war of succession to the Spanish crown. The English gave preference to Portuguese wines, thus definitively undermining the production and trade of Canarian wines practically until today.

Authorised Grape Varieties
The authorised grape varieties are:
 Red: Bastardo Negro, Listán Negro, Negramoll, Tintilla, and Malvasía Rosada are preferred; also authorised is Moscatel Negro
 White: Malvasía Volcánica, Gual, Bermejuela, Vijariego, Albillo, and Moscatel de Alejandría are preferred; also authorised are Listán Blanco, Burrablanca, Torrontés, Breval Blanca, Pedro Ximénez

References

External links
 D.O.P. Gran Canaria official website

Wine regions of Spain
Spanish wine
Appellations
Wine classification
Canary Islands cuisine